HD 222925 is a horizontal branch star about 1,470 light years away in the southern constellation Tucana.  It is magnitude 9, far below naked-eye visibility.  It is an Ap star, a type of chemically peculiar star with an over-abundance of certain metals in its spectrum.

HD 222925 has been referred to as the 'gold standard star' by the media. In 2022, astronomers from the University of Michigan identified 65 elements in the star (including gold), a turning point to help the scientific community understand the rapid neutron capture process. The elements were produced in a massive supernova or a merger of neutron stars early in the universe, and it was ejected into space where it later reformed into the current star.

Gallery

References 

Tucana (constellation)
Horizontal-branch stars
222925
117168
Durchmusterung objects
Ap stars
F-type giants